Justice, in comics, may refer to:

 Justice (DC Comics), a DC Comics limited series by Alex Ross and Jim Krueger
 Justice (New Universe), a Marvel Comics character and star of his own eponymous series in the New Universe imprint
 Justice, an alias used by the Marvel Comics character Vance Astrovik
 Justice, an Image Comics character, who is the son of SuperPatriot and, with his sister, one half of Liberty & Justice

It may also refer to:

 Justice, Inc., two DC Comics series based on the character The Avenger
 Justice League, a DC Comics superhero team who had a number of spin-offs:
 Justice League International
 Justice League Europe
 Justice League Elite
 Justice League Task Force (comics)
 Justice League Quarterly
 Extreme Justice
 Justice Leagues
 Young Justice
 Justice Guild of America, a superhero team featured in the Justice League animated series two-part episode Legends
 Justice Lords, an antihero superhero team featured in the two-part Justice League episode, "A Better World"
 Justice Machine, a superhero team who were published through the 1980s and 1990s by a number of companies
 Justice Riders, a DC Comics comic book placing the Justice League in the Old West as part of the Elseworlds imprint
 Justice Society of America, a DC Comics superhero team
 Lady Justice (comics), a title created by Neil Gaiman
 Sentinels of Justice, an Americomics (AC Comics) superhero team
 Squadron of Justice, two Fawcett Comics (later DC Comics) superhero teams

See also
 Justice (disambiguation)